One Dollar Too Many is a 1968 Spaghetti Western feature film directed by Enzo G. Castellari and starring Antonio Sabàto, John Saxon, and Frank Wolff.

Plot summary
Sabàto, Wolff, and Saxon are three different types of con men out to get a bag full of money stolen from a bank.

Cast
 Antonio Sabato as Moses Lang
 John Saxon as Clay Watson
 Frank Wolff as Edwin Kean
 Agata Flori as Rosario Fuentes
 Leo Anchóriz as Garrito Lopez
 Antonio Vico as Jeremias Casey
 Rossella Bergamonti as Hotel Receptionist
 Tito García as Corpulent member of Garrito's horde
 Edi Biagetti as Mr. Baker

Production
Director Enzo G. Castellari described One Dollar Too Many as "a true slapstick with an abundance of stuntment, exaggerated action and three important actors: John Saxon, who I finally got to meet, Frank Wolff and Antonio Sabato. Castellari specifically noted Saxon stating that both had similar tastes such as a love of art and that they both had "attended the Accademeia delle Belle Arti [Academy of Fine Arts] in Rome" where Castellari got his diploma. Saxon made several Westerns during the 1960s.

Castellari stated that the only issue he had with the film was Agata Flori as the female lead, as she was cast by producer Dario Sabatello, her lover at the time.

Release
One Dollar Too Many was first distributed in 1968. It was distributed by Titanus in Italy.

References

Sources

External links
 
 

1968 films
Spanish Western (genre) films
Spaghetti Western films
1960s Italian-language films
English-language Italian films
English-language Spanish films
1960s English-language films
Films directed by Enzo G. Castellari
Films scored by Carlo Rustichelli
1968 Western (genre) films
Films shot in Almería
1960s multilingual films
Italian multilingual films
Spanish multilingual films
1960s Italian films